Ottu or Otu is a village under Tehsil Rania in the Sirsa district of Haryana state of India. The village is situated on Sirsa-Rania Road. It is the site of the Ottu barrage on the Ghaggar-Hakra River..

References

Villages in Sirsa district